The Drive of Life is a 2007 grand production drama by TVB and CCTV as a joint production. It was specially filmed to celebrate the 10th Anniversary of the handover of Hong Kong back to China from Britain during the period of 1997-2007.

The theme of the series revolves around the automobile industry in China. Told in flashback from 1994, the ups and downs and transformations that Hong Kong has been experiencing before and after the transfer of the sovereignty of Hong Kong is used as a narrative device. The series was filmed in Hong Kong, Beijing, Ningbo and Vancouver from early October 2006 until May 2007. The automobiles featured in the series are from Geely Automobile, as a fictional brand name "Hua-Zhe". This stars "TVB Best Actress" winners Charmaine Sheh, Jessica Hsuan, Myolie Wu and Sheren Tang who won their respective "Best Actress" awards in 2006/2014, 1999, 2011, and 2009/2010.

Astro On Demand, Astro's video on demand service, starts with the series premiere.

Synopsis
Wah Man-hon, Wah Man-hung and Wah Man-shek were all born in Beijing. As a result of the massive political upheaval and the profound misunderstanding among them, the three brothers have fallen out and now live separately in Hong Kong, Beijing and Vancouver respectively.

Man-hon's business goes down the pan in the aftermath of the Asian Financial Crisis. The only saving grace is that members of the Wah family from around the world, including Man-hon's son Wah Chun-bong and Hung's son Wah Chun-man, can finally put their prejudice aside and become reconciled with one another. To realize the century-old dream of the family, they decide to work together to develop the local automobile industry.

After ten years of struggle, the Wahs have established its own brand of automobile – a brand the whole Chinese nation is proud of. They make a significant and ongoing contribution to China's automobile industry for they believe that only cars of our own will take us to a better future.

Cast

Main cast
Wah family

Ng family

Wing family

Fong family

Other cast

Wah Git Automobile Corporation (Hua-Zhe) 
Jason Chan as Chai Hoi
Bruce Li as Po Gam
Henry Lo as Jung Dung
Felix Lok as Chan Jen Cheung
Ellesmere Choi as Ng Zhi-ming
Reyan Yan as So San
Ng Wai-shan as Ka Ling
Anita Kwan as Siu Man
Koo Ming-wa as Lo Hon
Anita Kwan as Siu Man
Adam Ip as employee
Martin Tong as employee
Jason Lam as employee
Steven Ho as employee
Candy Cheung as employee
Pauline Chow as employee
Jim Tang as employee
Wong Wai-tak as Matthew
Gregory Charles Rivers as R&D group leader
Tsang Wai-wan as researcher
Wong Ka-yi as secretary
Wilson Tsui

Kwok Wai Steel Corporation
Kwong Chor-fai
Kong Hon
Joe Junior
Simon Lo
Kwok Tak-shun
Lee Hoi-sang
Leo Tsang
Chu Wai-tak
Tsui Wing
Siu Chuen-yung as Ho Kin

Sirius International Investment Corporation
Rocky Cheng as Rocky
Rachel Kan as Ngai Tin-hang's secretary

Bedding & Pillow Company
So Yun-chi as Mrs Cheung
Law Ho-kai as Mr Go

Canada & associates
Ko Jun-man as Mr Kwan
Lee Gong-lung as Mr Chan
Billy Lam as detective
Lee Cheung-dou as Yuen Yiu-wai
Chan On-ying as Mrs Yuen
Joseph Yeung as psychologist

Others
Michael Wong as Wai Lun
Zhao Ke as Lee Seen-sin
Angela Tong as Chi Chi
Leanne Li as Bo Wai
Deno Cheung as Lam Leung
Matthew Ko
Vivien Yeo as Carman
Annie Chung as car fan
Yeung Ying-wai as Peter
Henry Lee as bank executive
Cheng Ka-sang as Tai Tung Tat garage worker
Patrick Dunn as Lee Kai-fat
Ha Ping as Wah family's great aunty (ep22)
Yu Tze-ming as Wong Cheung
Lau Tin-lung as reporter
Meini Cheung as Kong Man
Leung Kin Ping as Mr Ma (ep32)
Chin Kar-lok as Chan Ka-lok (ep33-35)
Jo Jo as Cho Hung (ep35)
Tammy Ho
Siu Cheuk-hiu as Mr Cheung
Lee Tsi-kei as Muk Chuen
Ng Man-sang as interpreter
Winnie Shum
Jacky Yeung
Chan Yu-hei
Ho Jun-hin as stock broker
Kwok Fung as Sung Hok-li
Lee Fung
Law Kwan-chor
Candy Cheung
Peter Pang as jockey club staff
Lee Kai-kit as doctor
Wong Kei-sen as a signature specialist
Helena Wong

Theme song
The Sky is Blue (天這樣藍)
Lyrics: Sandy Chang
Composition and Arrangement: Joseph Koo
Performance: Hacken Lee and Steve Chou

Viewership ratings

Awards and nominations
40th TVB Anniversary Awards (2007)
"Best Drama"
"Best Actor in a Leading Role" (Damian Lau) Top 5
"Best Actor in a Leading Role" (Michael Miu)
"Best Actor in a Leading Role" (Raymond Lam) Top 5
"Best Actor in a Supporting Role" (Ng Wai-kwok) Top 5
"Best Actress in a Supporting Role" (Gigi Wong) Top 5
"Best Actress in a Supporting Role" (Toby Leung)
"My Favourite Male Character Role" (Damian Lau)
"My Favourite Male Character Role" (Michael Miu)
"My Favourite Male Character Role" (Ng Wai-kwok)
"My Favourite Male Character Role" (Joe Ma)

References

External links
TVB.com The Drive of Life - Official Website 
CCTV Official Site The Drive of Life 
K for TVB.net The Drive of Life - Episodic Synopsis and Screen Captures 
Can Success be Measured with Money? A Look at the 'Drive' of Life Episode Analysis 

TVB dramas
2007 Hong Kong television series debuts
2007 Hong Kong television series endings